In skyrunning, a vertical kilometer is an uphill mountain running race with an elevation gain of 1,000 metres. The Vertical Kilometer World Circuit also defines it as covering less than 5 km. Trekking poles, which are allowed as optional accessories, are often used in vertical kilometer races.

Related events include the Double Vertical Kilometer and Triple Vertical Kilometer.

Records

The official vertical km record belongs to Italian Philip Götsch, who in 2017 won the Kilomètre vertical de Fully with a time of 28:53.

In 2021, the men's FKT (Fastest Known Time) was set by Kilian Jornet at Vengetind, Norway with a time of 28:48.

Up to 2017, the men's world record was 29:42, set in 2014 in Fully, Switzerland by Italian skyrunner Urban Zemmer (see Kilomètre vertical de Fully).

The women's world record is 34:44, set in Fully, Switzerland by French skyrunner Christel Dewalle.

Races
The Vertical Kilometer World Circuit is an annual international circuit. It was started in 2017 as a spin-off of Skyrunner World Series. The circuit consists of 17 races that are held annually from May to October.

The Kilomètre vertical de Fully (Fully Vertical Kilometer) is one of the best-known vertical kilometer competitions.

See also
 Vertical Kilometer World Circuit
 Skyrunning
 Trail running
 Mountain running

References

 
Skyrunning
Running by type
Long-distance running
Events in the sport of athletics